Rhodeus albomarginatus is a species of freshwater ray-finned fish in the genus Rhodeus.  It is endemic to China, where it is found in the Lvjiang River of the Yangtze River drainage and uses the freshwater mussel Ptychorhynchus murinum  as its host for spawning.

References

Rhodeus
Fish described in 2014